The following is a list of programs broadcast by the U.S cable and satellite network Spike and its predecessors, The National Network and The Nashville Network. The Spike branding was in-use from August 2003 until January 2018, when the network was relaunched as Paramount Network.

Spike

Dramas
18 Wheels of Justice (2000–2001)
Blade: The Series (2006)
Afro Samurai (2007)
The Kill Point (2007)
Kung Fu Killer (2008)
Tut (2015)
The Shannara Chronicles (2016–2017)
The Mist (2017)

Comedies
I 40 Paradise (1983-1986)
Factory (2008)
MoCap, LLC (2009)
Super Dave's Spike-Tacular (2009)
Players (2010)
Blue Mountain State (2010-2011)

Animated comedies
Gary the Rat (2003)
Ren & Stimpy Adult Party Cartoon (2003)
Stripperella (2003–2004)
This Just In! (2004)

Specials and films

Spike TV's 52 Favorite Cars (2004)
AutoRox Awards (2005)
Metal of Honor: The Ironworkers of 9/11 (2006)
Until Death (2007)
Ring of Death (2008)
S.I.S. (2008)
Sharpshooter (2008)
Backwoods (2008)
Crash and Burn (2008)
Depth Charge (2008)
Finish Line (2008)
Mask of the Ninja (2008)
Street Warrior (2008)
Afro Samurai: Resurrection (2009)
1000 Ways to Lie (2010)
U.S. Navy: Pirate Hunters (2010)
Alternate History: Nazi's Win WW2 (2011)
I Am Bruce Lee (2012)
Covert Kitchens (2013)
Hiring Squad (2013)
I Am Evel Knievel (2014)
I Am Steve McQueen (2014)
Ink Shrinks (2014)
I Am Chris Farley (2015)
I Am Dale Earnhardt (2015)
I Am JFK Jr. (2016)
I Am Heath Ledger (2017)
I Am Sam Kinison (2017)
Time: The Kalief Browder Story (2017)

Programming blocks
Casino Cinema
PowerBlock

Sports

PRCA Rodeo (TNN) (1986-2002)
NASCAR on TNN (1991–2000)
PBR Bull Riding (TNN) (1993-2002)
Motor Madness (TNN) (1997–1998)
RollerJam (TNN) (1999–2000)
WWF Superstars (TNN) (2000–2001)
WWF Excess  (TNN) (2001–2002)
WWE Confidential (2003–2004)
WWE Sunday Night HEAT (2003–2005)
WWE Velocity (2003–2005)
WWE Experience (2004–2005)
WWE Raw (2003–2005)
Champ Car World Series (2004)
Untold: The Greatest Sports Stories Never Told (2004–2005)
Maximum MLB (2005)
NBA Rookies (2005–2012)
TNA iMPACT!/Impact Wrestling (2005–2014)
UFC Unleashed (2005–2007)
The Ultimate Fighter (2005–2011)
Ultimate Fighting Championship (2005–2012)
Wild World of Spike (2007)
TNA Epics (2010)
TNA Reaction (2010)
MMA Uncensored Live (2012)
Bellator MMA Live (2013–2017)
Premier Boxing Champions (2015–2017)
Glory
Red Bull X-Fighters

Reality/non-scripted programs

Fandango (1983-1989)
Nashville Now (1983-1993)
You Can Be A Star (1983-1989)
Country Kitchen (1985-1994)
Grand Ole Opry Live (1985)
Crook & Chase (1986-1999)
New Country (1986-1988)
Opry Backstage (1987-2001)
A Conversation with Dinah (1989-1992)
Top Card (1989-1993)
Truckin' USA (1989-1996)
Club Dance (1991-1999)
10 Seconds (1993-1994)
Music City Tonight (1993-1995)
Prime Time Country (1996-1999)
Hee Haw (1996-1997)
Car and Driver Television (1999-2005)
Trucks! (2001-2009)
Hotlines (2003-2004)
The Joe Schmo Show (2003-2013)
MXC (2003-2007)
Ride with Funkmaster Flex (2003-2004)
Spike Video Game Awards (2003-2013)
The John Henson Project (2004)
10 Things Every Guy Should Experience (2004)
The Club (2004-2005)
Hey! Spring of Trivia (2004-2005)
I Hate My Job (2004-2005)
Midnight Spike (2004)
On the Road: A True Rock-n-Roll Road Story (2004)
Spike Likes Movies (2004)
True Dads (2004)
The Ultimate Gamer (2004-2006)
Carpocalypse (2005-2006)
Boom! (2005)
GameTrailers TV with Geoff Keighley (2005-2013)
The Lance Krall Show (2005)
The Playbook (2005-2006)
Super Agent (2005)
Invasion Iowa (2005)
Disorderly Conduct: Video on Patrol (2006-2009)
The Dudesons (2006-2010)
Fresh Baked Videogames (2006)
HorsePower TV (2006-2013)
King of Vegas (2006)
MuscleCar (2006-2013)
Pros vs. Joes (2006-2010)
Raising the Roofs (2006)
Scream Awards (2006-2011)
World's Most Amazing Videos (2006-2008)
Xtreme 4x4 (2006-2013)
Manswers (2007-2011)
Bullrun (2007-2010)
Murder (2007)
Reality Racing (2007)
Toughest Cowboy (2007-2009)
1000 Ways to Die (2008-2012)
DEA (2008-2009)
Real Vice Cops Uncut (2008-2009)
4th and Long (2009)
Deadliest Warrior (2009-2011)
Jesse James Is a Dead Man (2009)
Surviving Disaster (2009)
Auction Hunters (2010-2015)
Half Pint Brawlers (2010)
Permanent Mark (2010)
Scrappers (2010)
Sports Crash (2010)
Unique Autosports: Miami (2010)
Coal (2011)
Flip Men (2011-2012)
Jail (2011-2017)
Phowned! (2011)
Bar Rescue (2011-2017)
Repo Games (2011-2012)
Big Easy Justice (2012)
All Access (2012-2013)
Diamond Divers (2012)
GT Academy (2012-2014)
Ink Master (2012-2018)
Rat Bastards (2012)
Savage Family Diggers (aka American Digger) (2012-2013)
Tattoo Nightmares (2012-2015)
Undercover Stings (2012)
World's Wildest Police Videos (2012)
World's Worst Tenants (2012-2013)
#Rampage4Real (2013)
Car Lot Rescue (2013)
Criss Angel BeLIEve (2013)
Fight Master: Bellator MMA (2013)
Never Ever Do This at Home (2013)
Cops (2013-2017)
Tattoo Rescue (2013)
Urban Tarzan (2013)
10 Million Dollar Bigfoot Bounty (2014)
Catch a Contractor (2014-2015)
Frankenfood (2014)
Gym Rescue (2014)
Hungry Investors (2014)
Tattoo Nightmares: Miami (2014)
Thrift Hunters (2014)
Coaching Bad (2015)
Framework (2015)
Lip Sync Battle (2015-2017)
Sweat Inc. (2015)
Forensic Justice (2016)
 That Awkward Game Show (2016-2017)
Ink Master: Angels (2017)

Acquired programs

That's Country (1983–84)
Bill Dance Outdoors (1989–2002)
Hee Haw (1993–95)
Dallas (1996–2000)
Cagney & Lacey (2000)
Three's Company (2000)
Miami Vice (2001–04)
Baywatch (2001–06)
Real TV (2001–07)
Star Trek: The Next Generation (2001–07)
The A-Team (2002; 2006–07)
V.I.P. (2002–07)
CSI: Crime Scene Investigation (2002–09)
Cheers (2003–04)
Highlander: The Series (2003–04)
Blind Date (2003–06)
Seven Days (2003–09)
Maximum Exposure (2003–06)
Kevin Spencer (2003-2006)
MacGyver (2004–06)
Shipmates (2004–06)
Star Trek: Deep Space Nine (2004–09)
The Three Stooges (2005–08)
The Equalizer (2006)
The Shield (2006–11)
Star Trek: Voyager (2006–11)
CSI: NY (2006–14)
I Bet You Will (2008)
Married... with Children (2008–10)
Unsolved Mysteries (2008–12)
Band of Brothers (2009)
Scrubs (2009)
Beavis and Butt-Head (2009)
Son of the Beach (2010–11)
The Unit (2010–11)
Entourage (2010–14)
The King of Queens (2011)
'Til Death (2011–2013)
Black Ink Crew (2016)
Campus PD (2017)
American Start-Up
Be a Star
Behind the Bar
Beyond Scared Straight
Celebrity Outdoors
CSI: Miami
Gangland
Gangsters: America's Most Evil
The Hoop Life
I Dare You: The Ultimate Challenge
The Ren & Stimpy Show
Sasuke
Whacked Out Sports
When Animals Attack!
When Good Pets Go Bad
World's Wildest Police Videos

The National Network (The New TNN)

Original programming on The National Network
Fame For 15 (2001)
Lifegame (2001)
Pop Across America (2001)
Robot Wars: Extreme Warriors (2001-2002)
Small Shots (2001-2003)
Ultimate Revenge (2001-2003)
Oblivious (2002-2004)
Robot Wars: Grand Champion (2002-2003)
The Conspiracy Zone (2002)
Taboo (2003)

Sports on The National Network
ECW on TNN (1999–2000)
AFL on TNN (2000–2003)
WWE Raw (2000–2003)
WWF LiveWire (2000–2001)
WWF Superstars (2000–2001)
WWF Excess (2001–2002)
NCAA Final Four Highlights on TNN (2002-2003)
Slamball (2002–2003)
WWE Confidential (2002–2003)
WWE Heat (2002-2003)
WWE Velocity (2002–2003)

Acquired programming

The Dukes of Hazzard (1996–2001)
The Waltons (1998–2002)
Alice (1999–2001)
The Real McCoys (1999–2001)
Martial Law (2000–01)
Starsky & Hutch (2000–01)
Newhart (2001)
The Rockford Files (2001)
Taxi (2001)
WKRP in Cincinnati (2001)
The Wonder Years (2001)
Picket Fences (2001–02)
Hangin' with Mr. Cooper (2001–03)
Kids Say the Darndest Things (2001–03)
MADtv (2001–03)
Diff'rent Strokes (2002)
Celebrity Deathmatch (2002)
American Gladiators (2002–03)

Unaired series
In its early days as Spike TV, Spike commissioned an animated series from Klasky Csupo, Immigrants, featuring two Hungarian men who moved to Los Angeles to start a new life. The series was to have debuted on August 14, 2004. Despite scheduling a two-hour marathon of the series on its premiere, it was canceled on August 6, 2004, for unknown reasons. Spike instead aired a two-hour block of Most Extreme Elimination Challenge. The series has since become the basis of a 2008 film of the same name, which was first released in Hungary in October 2008.

See also
 List of programs broadcast by Paramount Network

References

Spike